The Haisborough Group is a Triassic lithostratigraphic group (a sequence of rock strata) beneath the southern part of the North Sea . The name is derived from the Haisborough Sands off the coast of Norfolk. The Group is up to 900m thick and comprises red, brown and grey mudstones with beds of halite and anhydrite. It is the offshore equivalent of the Mercia Mudstone Group as recorded in the northeast of England.

References

Triassic System of Europe
Geology of the North Sea